The badminton women's singles tournament at the 1994 Asian Games in Hiroshima took place from 11 October to 15 October at Tsuru Memorial Gymnasium.

Schedule
All times are Japan Standard Time (UTC+09:00)

Results

References
Results

External links
Results

Women's singles